The Lab School may mean:

 laboratory school
 The Education Laboratory School in Honolulu, Hawaii
 The Baltimore Lab School in Baltimore, Maryland
 The Lab School of Bethlehem Central High School in Delmar, New York
 The Lab School of Washington in District of Columbia
 The Martin Luther King Junior Laboratory School in Evanston, Illinois
 The Model Laboratory School in Richmond, Kentucky
 The NYC Lab School in New York City
 The University of Chicago Laboratory Schools in Chicago

Differences and disabilities